Liège–Rome–Liège (nicknamed The Road Marathon) was a rally road race over some of Europe's toughest mountain roads held from 1931 to 1971. It was reserved for so-called tourism cars.

Background

The race took place on an open road, an average distance of 3,500 km non-stop (sometimes more than 5,000 km as in 1959): departing Wednesday at 11 pm from Spa, and returning to the same place on Sunday around 4 pm.  A Golden Cup was also sometimes awarded to three-year class winners such as Bill Bengry.  The rally of August 1939 was the last major rally event before World War II. Belgium's Ginet Trasenster of (Bugatti) and France's Jean Trevoux in a (Hotchkiss) car tied for first place, denying the German works teams shortly before their countries were overrun. This was one of five Liège wins for Trasenster.

The Liège continued as uncompromisingly an open road event run to an impossible time schedule, and remained Europe's toughest rally until it had moved to Yugoslavia and Bulgaria. From 1961 to 1964, the course was modified to Liège-Sofia-Liège. Indeed, this reflected the desire of the organizer — the Royal Motor Union of Liège to diversify the route and to find traffic-free roads.  From 1965 to 1971, the Nürburgring race was held due to the refusal of some countries to cross their territory. The duration of the race was 82 hours to reach 96 hours in its last edition.

A revival was planned for 2011 but was cancelled.  Many renowned drivers participated such as Olivier Gendebien, Willy Mairesse, Lucien Bianchi, and Jacky Ickx.

Awards
Record holder of number of victories: Ginet Trasenster, 5

Liège–Rome–Liège, 1930s

1931: Willy Toussaint – Alphonse Evrard (Bugatti 49);

1932: Baron Orban de Xivry -L.Havelange (Bugatti 46);

1933: Télesphore George -Collon (FN 3.2L), and Paul von Guillaume -Mrs L.Bahr (Adler 2L Favorit);

1934: Alfonso Evrard – Jean Trasenster (Bugatti) and Peter Collin – M me Collin (Bugatti) and Charles Lahaye – René Quatresous (Renault) and Paul von Guillaume -Mme L.Bahr ( Imperia ), and Van Naemen- Ferruccio Canciani (Lancia), and Max Thirion (Germaine's father) – Georges Bourianou (Bugatti), and Hans-Joachim Bernet – Max Sailer (Mercedes-Benz);

1935: Jean Trasenster – Franz Breyre (Bugatti), and Charles Lahaye – René Quatresous (Renault Nervasport);

1936: Cancelled, by contestation of dates by the Belgian authorities ;

1937: Karl Haeberle 3 – Walter Glökler (Hanomag – builder: K.Haeberle);

1938: Jean Trasenster – Franz Breyre (Bugatti);

1939: Jean Trasenster – Franz Breyre (Bugatti), and Jean Trévoux – Marcel Lesurque (Hotchkiss);

Liège-Rome-Liège, 1950s and 1960s

1950: Claude Dubois – Charles of Cortanze (Peugeot 203 Special 1 490  cm 3 );

1951: Johnny Claes – Jacques Ickx (Jaguar XK 120);

1952: Helmut Polensky – Walter Schlüter (Porsche 356);

1953 ( 9th  round of the first European Rally Championship ): Johnny Claes – Jean Trasenster (Lancia Aurelia GT);

1954: Helmut Polensky – Herbert Linge (Porsche 356);

1955: Olivier Gendebien – Pierre Stasse (Mercedes-Benz 300 SL)

1956: Willy Mairesse - Willy Genin (Mercedes-Benz 300 SL); 3rd Olivier Gendebien – Pierre Stasse (Ferrari 250 GT Europa)

1957: Claude Storez – Robert Buchet (Porsche 356)

1958: Jean Hébert – Bernard Consten (Alfa Romeo Giulietta)

1959: Robert Buchet – Paul Ernst Strähle (Porsche 356 Carrera), and Jacques Féret – Guy Monraisse (Renault)

1960: Pat Moss – Ann Wisdom (Austin Healey 3000)

Liège–Sofia–Liège (via Sofia in Bulgaria)

1961: Lucien Bianchi – George Harris (Citroen DS 19)

1962: Eugen Böhringer – Hermann Eger (Mercedes-Benz 220 SE)

1963: Eugen Böhringer – Klaus Kaiser (Mercedes-Benz 230 SL)

1964: Rauno Aaltonen – Tony Ambrose (Austin Healey 3000)
Eighty-Two Hours of the Nürburgring (Road Marathon):

1965: Henri Greder – Johnny Rives (Ford Mustang), and Rainer Ising – Bernd Degner (Porsche)
Eighty-four hours of the Nürburgring (Road Marathon):

1966: Julien Vernaeve – Andrew Hedges (MGB GT), and Jacky Ickx – Gilbert Staepelaere (Ford)

1967: Edgar Herrmann – Jochen Neerpasch – Vic Elford (Porsche 911R)

1968: Herbert Linen – Dieter Glemser – Willi Kauhsen (Porsche 911)

1969: Harry Källström – Sergio Barbasio – Fall Tony (Lancia Fulvia HF 1.6)
Eighty-Six Hours of the Nürburgring (Road Marathon):

1970: Gerard Larrousse – Marko Helmut – Claude Haldi (VW-Porsche 914/6)
Four-Twenty-Six Hours of the Nürburgring (Road Marathon):

1971: Jacques Henry – Maurice Nusbaumer – Jean-Luc Therier (Alpine-Renault A110)

See also 

 Liège-Brescia-Liège

References

Rally competitions in Belgium
Rally competitions in Italy
Rally competitions in Germany
Rally competitions in Bulgaria
World Sportscar Championship races
Recurring sporting events established in 1931
Recurring sporting events disestablished in 1971